The Djedi Project was an exploration of the interior of the Great Pyramid of Giza. The project team was made up of international and Egyptian experts. The name derived from Djedi, the ancient Egyptian magician consulted by Pharaoh Khufu  when planning his famous pyramid. As Dr. Zahi Hawass announced on his blog: "The purpose of this project is to send a robotic tunnel explorer into the two "air shafts" that lead from the Queen's Chamber of the Great Pyramid of Khufu to gather evidence to determine the purpose of the shafts."

The team was managed by University of Leeds and supported by Dassault Systemes in France.

A detailed report of the project can be found on the web.

Team members
The team included:
Ng Tze Chuen (Hong Kong), independent researcher
Shaun Whitehead (UK), independent researcher, Scoutek
Robert Richardson (UK), Professor of Robotics, School of Mechanical Engineering, University of Leeds, UK
Ron Grieve (Canada), from Tekron Services, Canada
Other key team members are Andrew Pickering, Stephen Rhodes, Adrian Hildred, Jason Liu, William Mayfield and Andrew Smyth.

The team made preliminary studies of the airshafts in July and December 2009, and continued its work in 2011.

Equipment
Details of the Djedi Team Robot:
"Pinhole camera" that can fit through small spaces and see around corners like an endoscope
A miniaturised ultrasonic device that can tap on walls and listen to the response to help determine the thickness and condition of the stone
A miniature "beetle" robot that can fit through a hole of 20mm diameter for further exploration in confined spaces
Precision compass and inclinometer to measure the orientation of the shafts
A core drill that can penetrate the second blocking stone (if necessary and feasible) while removing the minimum amount of material necessary

Results 
Small red markings were found inside the second-door small shaft space. The back of the door was filmed which showed the rest of two ornate metal handles.

Development of the project and photographic findings were published in the Journal of Field Robotics.

See also
The Upuaut Project

References

External links 

Great Pyramid of Giza
Climbing robots
2009 robots
Rolling robots
Dassault Group
University of Leeds
Palenque